Live: Legend 1999 & 1997 Apocalypse is the second live video release by the Japanese heavy metal band Babymetal. The album contains live footage of two shows, entitled Legend "1999" and Legend "1997" (named after birth years of the members of Babymetal), performed in Japan in 2013. It was released in 2-disc DVD and Blu-ray formats on October 29, 2014.

Background 
On February 2, 2013, Babymetal announced a show at NHK Hall on June 30, 2013, with tickets reportedly sold out almost immediately, on March 15, 2013. After the show, the band announced the show Legend "1997" set for December 21, 2013 at Makuhari Messe. About 8,000 people were present in the crowd for Legend "1997".

Live: Legend 1999 & 1997 Apocalypse was first announced on August 16, 2014, with an official trailer released on September 11, 2014. The video was released on October 29, 2014, containing the two concerts, Legend "1999" Yuimetal & Moametal Seitansai, and Legend "1997" Su-metal Seitansai, and were released in standard DVD and Blu-ray editions, and "Babymetal Apocalypse Web" fanclub exclusive "Babymetal Apocalypse Limited Box" editions additionally containing merchandise such as commemorative T-shirts and messages from the three members.

To commemorate the release, a digest of the shows was regularly broadcast by Yunika Vision onto Tokyo Station and Seibu-Shinjuku Station from October 23, 2014 to November 2, 2014. Customers who purchased the album at Tower Records stores could receive merchandise, such as a collaborative poster for No Music, No Idol?, volume 70, which had been announced prior on October 20, 2014. A promotion including a calendar card was also made available with a purchase; this was limited to the Tower Records store in Shinjuku.

The album also had a vinyl on August 25, 2021 to commemorate the band's tenth anniversary.

Content 
The concert Legend "1999" was performed on June 30, 2013, in between the 14th birthdays of Mizuno and Kikuchi. 3,600 attended the show at NHK Hall. Notably, Mizuno and Kikuchi cover the Petitmoni song "Chokotto Love" and Morning Musume song "Love Machine" (which were both released in 1999), respectively. The songs are subtitled Big Time Changes and From Hell With Love, respectively, and are named after albums released by heavy metal band Seikima-II. Additionally, Nakamoto debuts the power ballad "No Rain, No Rainbow", with Mizuno and Kikuchi later appearing to play the piano together; the song would later appear on the band's second album Metal Resistance.

The concert Legend "1997" begins with "Headbangeeeeerrrrr!!!!!" (Night of 15 mix), where Mizuno and Kikuchi begin on stage, while Nakamoto appears on a raised platform. The performance debuts the song "Gimme Chocolate!!", as well as an unfinished arrangement of "Akatsuki". In the encore, Mizuno and Kikuchi join as Black Santa Claus, performing "Onedari Daisakusen", and Nakamoto is ultimately tied up on a cross and crucified during the final song "Babymetal Death".

Reception 
Live: Legend 1999 & 1997 Apocalypse debuted on the Oricon daily DVD and Blu-ray charts, both at number four, on October 29, 2014, and peaked at number eight and four on the Oricon weekly DVD and Blu-ray charts, respectively, on the week of November 10, 2014. This also marked the band's debut on the weekly DVD chart. The video also peaked at number six and three, respectively in the music video sub-charts the same week.

Track listing

Personnel 
Credits adapted from Live: Legend 1999 & 1997 Apocalypse booklet.
 Su-metal (Suzuka Nakamoto) – lead and background vocals, dance
 Yuimetal (Yui Mizuno) – lead and background vocals (credited as "scream"), dance
 Moametal (Moa Kikuchi) – lead and background vocals (credited as "scream"), dance

Charts

Weekly charts

Daily charts

Release history

References

External links 
 News - Babymetal official website
 

Babymetal video albums
2014 video albums
2021 live albums
Live video albums